Djebel Aissa National Park (in Arabic: الحظيرة الوطنية لجبل عيسى) is a national park of the Saharan Atlas located to the west of Algeria, in the  wilaya of Naâma. It was created in 2003 and covers 24400 hectares.

Djebel Aissa National Park is of particular importance in preserving the ecosystem of the Western Highlands region, which is threatened by desertification and silting.

Flora and fauna

Flora
The most represented trees are: the Ziziphus, the Pistacia, the Juniperus phoenicea, the Quercus ilex, the Juniperus oxycedrus and the Pinus halepensis. There is also the Stipa tenacissima, the Esparto grass and the Artemisia alba.

Fauna
The park is home to the following mammal species: the Hare, the Wild Boar, the Jackal, the Fox, the Bustard, the Porcupine, the Barbary sheep, and the Dorcas gazelle.

External links 
 https://mjfas.utm.my/index.php/mjfas/article/view/1032/pdf

National parks of Algeria